Tzoah Rotachat (Hebrew: , Ṣōʾā Rōṯaḥaṯ – "boiling excrement") in the Talmud and Zohar is a location in Gehenna (Gehinnom) where the souls of Jews who committed certain sins are sent for punishment. This form of punishment is cited as being of extreme nature, if not the most extreme, in the sense that those individuals sentenced there are not given relief even on Shabbat, and are not released after the standard twelve-month period.

Babylonian Talmud
The Babylonian Talmud (Talmud Bavli) lists the cause for a Jew being sent to Tzoah Rotachat as "all who scoff at the words of the wise men (i.e., Chazal) is judged in Tzoah Rotachat".  The Babylonian Talmud also hints that the punishment has more of a physical implication to it. Rashi writes that he who engages in "excessive scoffing" (the exegesis here involves switching the "ה" of "להג" and replacing it with a "ע", as they both are one of the five guttural  sounds) (the former part of the verse) is met with the second part of the same "straining of the flesh", essentially being judged excessively (straining) of his body.

The supposed presence of Jesus the Nazarene in boiling excrement is one of the often-claimed references to Jesus in the Talmud. Onkelos raises up Yeshu by necromancy, and asks him about his punishment in Gehinnom. Jesus replies that he is in "boiling excrement."

Commentaries

Rabbi Yosef Karo
Joseph ben Ephraim Karo of Toledo (1488–1575), in his Kabbalistic work Maggid Meisharim ("Sermonizer on Ethics"), explains that just as in the human digestive order the liver, heart and other organs receive their sustaining nutrients from the ingested foods and whatever is of no need and "unworkable" is excreted to give fertility to works of low value (Sitra Achra "other side"), so too in heavenly judgment this soul is sent to the spiritual level equivalent of excrement and those that derive benefit thereof. As to the concept of boiling Rabbi Yosef relays as to imply during the time of heat and anger of that level (i.e. when the oven is hot), the soul is put there. Rabbi Yosef goes on to compare the idol worship of Peor as giving sustenance to this specific level of Sitra Achra.

Rabbi Yehuda Lowe's explanation
Judah Loew ben Bezalel of Prague (c.1520–1609), in his work Netzach Yisroel ("Eternity of Israel"), provides an in-depth analysis as to this seemingly unconnected sequence of action and punishment. Rabbi Lowe explains, as a rule of thumb, that the logic of Chazal is of an unrelated plane to that of common human intellect. Thus, one who scoffs at it is judged in the opposite of this higher plane, i.e. Tzoah Rotachat, which is considered a matter of irrelation to the relatively superior human body (since it is released as waste) and the antithesis of godly knowledge and presence (as is brought in Talmud Sukka p. 42b that one is obligated to distance himself from the excrement of a child who has the ability of speech since this excrement produces an intense odor comparative to infant who cannot yet speak ). Rabbi Lowe concludes that excrement is the polar opposite of refined godly intellect and worship and is thus the natural consequence of the scoffer thereof and of the Jew who chooses idol worship and Shituf.

Zohar
This defined location is quoted in the Zohar;

See also
 Gehenna
 Hell
 Jewish eschatology

References

External links 

Afterlife places
Jewish eschatology
Hebrew words and phrases
Jewish underworld
Talmud places
Gehenna